Chen Chien-li (born 29 September 1980) is a Taiwanese bobsledder. He competed in the four man event at the 2002 Winter Olympics.

References

1980 births
Living people
Taiwanese male bobsledders
Olympic bobsledders of Taiwan
Bobsledders at the 2002 Winter Olympics
Place of birth missing (living people)
21st-century Taiwanese people